Chapel of St. Francis Xavier is a church located in Coloane, Macau, China. The chapel, built in 1928, is located on the southwestern coast of the island and stands near a monument commemorating a victory over pirates in 1910.

Relics
The chapel used to contain some of the most sacred Christian relics in Asia, including the remains of 26 foreign and Japanese Catholic priests who were crucified in Nagasaki in 1597, as well as those of some of the Japanese Christians who were killed during the Shimabara Rebellion in 1637. They are now located in the Museum of Sacred Art and Crypt which was opened in 1996. Another relic was a bone from the arm of St. Francis Xavier, who died in 1552 on Shangchuan Island,  from Macau. This relic has been transferred to St. Joseph's Church.

References

Coloane
Roman Catholic churches in Macau
Roman Catholic chapels in China